James Shan (born 28 October 1978) is an English football coach who is a first-team coach at Sheffield Wednesday.

Playing career
Shan spent a three-month period in the youth set-up at Walsall at the age of 15. Following his spell at Walsall, Shan dropped down into non-league as a youth player, attending trials at Torquay United and Sheffield Wednesday. Shan also played for local club Paget Rangers.

Coaching career
Shan was a part of the coaching staff at childhood club Birmingham City, coaching various age groups in the club's academy set-up.

In 2006, Shan joined the coaching staff of West Bromwich Albion, working with the club's under-7s age group. He later worked as manager of the under-18, under-21 and under-23 sides, before joining the first-team coaching staff at the end of the 2017–18 season. In March 2019 he was appointed caretaker manager following the sacking of Darren Moore, leading the club to a 3–0 victory against Swansea City in his first game in charge. In April 2019 it was announced that Shan would remain as caretaker manager until the end of the 2018–19 season.

On 28 June 2019, Shan left West Bromwich Albion following Slaven Bilić's appointment as head coach.

On 6 December 2019, Shan was appointed as the interim manager of Kidderminster Harriers in the National League North, leaving on 11 February 2020. The following day he was announced as new manager of Solihull Moors of the National League. He was linked with a move to Sheffield Wednesday following their appointment of Darren Moore, and a day later he was relieved of his duties with Solihull Moors.

He was appointed assistant manager of Rochdale in July 2021. He left the club in August 2022.

On 30th September 2022 it was announced by Darren Moore that Shan had joined Sheffield Wednesday as a member of their technical team.

Personal life
As of March 2019 Shan has three sons.

Managerial statistics

References

1978 births
Living people
Footballers from Birmingham, West Midlands
English footballers
English football managers
Paget Rangers F.C. players
West Bromwich Albion F.C. non-playing staff
Birmingham City F.C. non-playing staff
West Bromwich Albion F.C. managers
English Football League managers
National League (English football) managers
Association footballers not categorized by position
Kidderminster Harriers F.C. managers
Solihull Moors F.C. managers
Rochdale A.F.C. non-playing staff 
Association football coaches
Sheffield Wednesday F.C. non-playing staff